The WTA Tier V tournaments were the fifth, and lowest, level of women's tennis tournaments on the WTA Tour between 1990 and 1992 and from 2001 to 2005. The line-up of events varied over the years, with tournaments being promoted, demoted or cancelled. Most of the Tier V tournaments became Tier IV events between 1993 and 2000 and from 2006 to 2008.

In 2009, WTA changed the tournament categories, so that most of the Tier III, Tier IV and Tier V tournaments from 2008 were placed in a single, WTA International tournaments, category.

Number of tournaments

Events

Past finals

1990

The 1990 WTA Tour consisted of 59 tournaments of which 12 were categorized as Tier V. These were tournaments approved by the WIPTC with prize money of $75,000.

1991
The 1991 WTA Tour consisted of 60 tournaments of which 14 were categorized as Tier V. These were tournaments approved by the WIPTC with prize money of $75,000 or $100,000.

1992
The 1992 WTA Tour consisted of 57 tournaments of which 14 were categorized as Tier V. These were tournaments approved by the WIPTC with prize money of $100,000.

2001
The 2001 WTA Tour consisted of 63 tournaments of which 8 were categorized as Tier V. These were tournaments approved by the WTA Tour with a minimum prize money of $110,000.

2002
The 2002 WTA Tour consisted of 64 tournaments of which 7 were categorized as Tier V. These were tournaments approved by the WTA Tour with a minimum prize money of $110,000.

2003
The 2003 WTA Tour consisted of 59 tournaments of which 6 were categorized as Tier V. These were tournaments approved by the WTA Tour with a minimum prize money of $110,000.

2004
The 2004 WTA Tour consisted of 60 tournaments of which 8 were categorized as Tier V. These were tournaments approved by the WTA Tour with a minimum prize money of $110,000.

2005
The 2005 WTA Tour consisted of 63 tournaments of which 2 were categorized as Tier V. These were tournaments approved by the WTA Tour with a minimum prize money of $110,000.

Notes

References

 Tier 5
Recurring sporting events established in 1990
Recurring sporting events disestablished in 2005